Centerville Town Hall is a historic town hall located at Centerville in Allegany County, New York.  It was completed in 1859 and is a 2-story, three-by-three-bay Greek Revival style former Presbyterian church building.  It has a large, 1-story horse / carriage house wing at the rear.  The building was used as a Grange hall from 1909 to 1927, after which it became the town hall.

It was listed on the National Register of Historic Places in 2009.

References

City and town halls on the National Register of Historic Places in New York (state)
Greek Revival architecture in New York (state)
Government buildings completed in 1859
Buildings and structures in Allegany County, New York
National Register of Historic Places in Allegany County, New York